In forestry, windthrow refers to trees uprooted by wind. Breakage of the tree bole (trunk) instead of uprooting is called windsnap. Blowdown refers to both windthrow and windsnap.

Causes 
Windthrow is common in all forested parts of the world that experience storms or high wind speeds. The risk of windthrow to a tree is related to the tree's size (height and diameter), the 'sail area' presented by its crown, the anchorage provided by its roots, its exposure to the wind, and the local wind climate. A common way of quantifying the risk of windthrow to a forest area is to model the probability or 'return time' of a wind speed that would damage those trees at that location. Another potential method is the detection of scattered windthrow based on satellite images. Tree senescence can also be a factor, where multiple factors contributing to the declining health of a tree reduce its anchorage and therefore increase its susceptibility to windthrow. The resulting damage can be a significant factor in the development of a forest.

Windthrow can also increase following logging, especially in young forests managed specifically for timber. The removal of trees at a forest's edge increases the exposure of the remaining trees to the wind.

Trees that grow adjacent to lakes or other natural forest edges, or in exposed situations such as hill sides, develop greater rooting strength through growth feedback with wind movement, i.e. 'adaptive' or 'acclimative' growth. If a tree does not experience much wind movement during the stem exclusion phase of stand succession, it is not likely to develop a resistance to wind. Thus, when a fully or partially developed stand is bisected by a new road or by a clearcut, the trees on the new edge are less supported by neighbouring trees than they were and may not be capable of withstanding the higher forces which they now experience.

Trees with heavy growths of ivy, wisteria, or kudzu are already stressed and may be more susceptible to windthrow, as the additional foliage increases the tree's sail area.

Trees with decayed trunk, fungus-induced cankers and borer damages are more susceptible to "windsnap".

Ecological effects 
Windthrow disturbance generates a variety of unique ecological resources on which certain forest processes are highly dependent. Windthrow can be considered a cataclysmic abiotic factor that can generate an entire new chain of seral plant succession in a given area. Windthrow can also be considered to act as a rejuvenating process whereby regeneration is made possible with new resource availability.

Severe uprooting opens bare patches of mineral soil that can act as seed sinks. These patches have been shown, in the Pacific Northwest of the United States, to have higher biodiversity than the surrounding forest floor. Additionally, the gap created in the forest canopy when windthrow occurs yields an increase in light, moisture, and nutrient availability in near proximity to the disturbance.

Toppled trees have the potential of becoming nurse logs, nurturing habitats for other forest organisms.

See also
 Derecho
 Krummholz: crooked, stunted trees
 Microburst: sinking air
 Reaction wood

References

 Alabama Hiking Trail Society Cited Dec. 2007
 USFS "Trail Information— State Route 410 Mather Memorial Parkway / Clearwater" Online bulletin board. Cited Dec. 15, 2007

Bibliography

  Nina G Ulanova, Forest Ecology and Management; Volume 135, Issues 1–3, 15 September 2000, Pages 155–167; The effects of windthrow on forests at different spatial scales: a review
 Canham, C.D. & Loucks, O.L. (1984) Catastrophic windthrow in the presettlement forests of Wisconsin. Ecology, 65, 803–809.
 Canham, C.D., Denslow, J.S., Platt, W.J., Runkle, J.R., Spies, T.A. & White, P.S. (1990) Light regimes beneath closed canopies and tree-fall gaps in temperate and tropical forests. Canadian Journal of Forest Research, 20, 620–631. 
 Canham, C.D., Papaik, M.J. & Latty, E.J. (2001) Interspecific variation in susceptibility to windthrow as a function of tree size and storm severity for northern hardwood tree species. Canadian Journal of Forest Research, 31, 1–10. 
 Mladenoff, D.J. (1987) Dynamics of nitrogen mineralization and nitrification in hemlock and hardwood treefall gaps. Ecology, 68, 1171–1180. 
 Peterson, C.J. & Pickett, S.T.A. (1995) Forest reorganization – A case study in an old-growth forest catastrophic blowdown. Ecology, 76, 763–774. 
 Pickett, S.T.A. & White (1985) Patch dynamics: a synthesis. The Ecology of Natural Disturbance and Patch Dynamics (eds S.T.A.Pickett & P.S.White), pp. 371–384. Academic Press, Orlando, FL. 
 Metcalfe, D. J., Bradford, M. G., & Ford, A. J. (2008). Cyclone damage to tropical rain forests: Species‐and community‐level impacts. Austral Ecology, 33(4), 432-441.

Biogeomorphology
Dead wood
Forest ecology
Wind